is a 2016 Japanese animated action fantasy film based on the Pretty Cure franchise created by Izumi Todo, and its thirteenth series, Witchy Pretty Cure. The film is directed by Yuta Tanaka, written by Jin Tanaka, and produced by Toei Animation. The film was released in Japanese theaters on October 29, 2016. It is a double feature including a fully CG animated short, titled .

The catchcopy of the film is

Plot

Cure Miracle and Mofurun's Magic Lesson!
Mirai and Mofurun have a magical lesson using the Miracle Lights, which soon gets out of hand as they start casting magic on each other.

Maho Girls PreCure! the Movie: The Miraculous Transformation! Cure Mofurun!
Mirai, Riko, Kotoha, and Mofurun attend a Grand Magic Festival that takes place once every 100 years to celebrate the return of a Wishing Stone that can grant a wish to whomever it chooses. As the stone awakens and chooses Mofurun, who has no particular wish she wants to grant for herself, the festival is attacked by an evil bear known as Dark Matter, who steals the stone and captures Mofurun, hoping to use her wish to erase all magicians. While trying to escape from Dark Matter, Mofurun comes across a village of bears and befriends a black bear named Kumata, who is feared by the other villagers because of his ability to use magic. When Mofurun attempts to return to her friends, Kumata reveals himself to be Dark Matter, who states that he will not harm the girls as long as she stays with him. As Mirai tells Mofurun her wish to always be with her, Mofurun's desire to be with her in return reacts with the Wishing Stone, transforming her into Cure Mofurun. Noticing that Kumata's anger comes from the loneliness he felt from everyone being afraid of his magical power, Mofurun sacrifices herself to try and get through to Kumata, who realises that what he truly wanted was a friend. As all of Dark Matter's negative energy that was released from Kumata merges into its own dark entity, cancelling out everyone's magic and spreading chaos across the magical world, Mirai remains determined not to give up. Spurred on by Mirai's determination, all the living creatures in the magical world, including Kumata himself, unite their wishes together, bringing Mofurun back to life and allowing the Cures to transform to confront the source of the evil magic and defeat it. As the Wishing Stone once again disappears, along with Mofurun's powers, Kumata manages to start making friends of his own.

Voice cast 

Rie Takahashi as Mirai Asahina/Cure Miracle 
Yui Horie as Riko Izayoi/Cure Magical 
Saori Hayami as Kotoha Hanami/Cure Felice 
Ayaka Saito as Mofurun/Cure Mofurun 
Yūya Uchida as Principal 
Yoshino Ohtori as Vice principal 
Satomi Arai as Cathy/Magic Crystal 
Makoto Ishii as François
Kaori Nazuka as Liz 
Toshiharu Sakurai as Isaac 
Aki Kanada as Jun 
Maya Yoshioka as Kei 
Chinami Hashimoto as Emily 
Shota Yamamoto as Yokubaru

Film exclusive characters

Daisuke Namikawa as:
, a black bear who wish to help people but flee because they fear him, this makes him bear a vendetta towards people and brainwashed by Dark Matter to take an appearance of adult bear wearing a mask. He captures Mofurun to help her make her wish come true but she escapes. He takes the form of a young bear to manipulate Mofurun until he reveals himself. He attacks the Cures but Mofurun lets herself be defeated to make him snap out of it. Dark Matter come out of his body and he help the Cures to face Dark Matter. After Dark Matter's death, he bid farewell to everyone and stay at Bear Village.
, the main antagonist of the film. An evil entity who brainwashes Kumata until Kumata strikes Mofurun and force him to reveal his true form. The Cures, with the help of Kumata, enter Dark Matter's body and defeat him with Heartful Rainbow. Once Dark Matter/Kumata realizes what he's done to Mofurun, his magic power turns into . The giant shadow creates magic circles everywhere in the Magic World from which lightning strikes that cancels magic and turns people into stone statues. When the girls, with the help of everyone's Miracle Light wishes, revive Mofurun and transform back into Cures, the giant shadow focuses on attacking them instead. With the help of the flare dragon, they break into the giant shadow and find an evil magic version of Dark Matter, Shadow Matter inside. After a fierce battle using all their transformations, the Cures use Mofurun's new Heartful Linkle Stone to perform Heartful Rainbow and defeat it.
Kotoha is able to communicate with it and together they spew a fireball and turn it into fireworks. When Dark Matter disrupts the festival and abducts both the Wishing Stone and Mofurun, he also turns the Flare Dragon into  and flies away on it. Later, when the girls are looking for Mofurun, the Shadow Dragon shows up again and attacks them. Being the only one left who can do so, Kotoha transforms into Cure Felice and distracts it while the others go ahead to Dark Matter's lair. When Cure Mofurun is fighting an enraged Dark Matter while Mirai frees Riko, Cure Felice returns together with the Flare Dragon. The others are surprised to see it, but Felice explains how she discovered that the Shadow Dragon was actually the Flare Dragon, possessed by Dark Matter's shadows. She used Pink Tourmaline to get rid it of the shadows. After that, the Flare Dragon helps the Cures fly out of Dark Matter's lair. Later, it helps them break into the giant shadow to battle its core Pure Shadow Matter.

Production
This is the first film appearance of Cure Felice. It was also announced that the Cures' fairy Mofurun will transform into a film-only Cure in the film.

In addition to the movie-exclusive , the film also features a movie-only Cure, . It was reported that due to Mofurun being defined in the original setting as having no gender, she wears kabocha pants in order to give a neutral impression.

It was announced that a computer-generated short film would be screened with the movie, and that AKB48 member Mayu Watanabe would be in charge of both the theme song and the main film's feature song. Watanabe has been a fan of the franchise since elementary school, and would perform the theme songs on karaoke and buy goods at the Pretty Cure shop at Tokyo Station. She said "When I heard the story, I was happy and dreamed about it." Watanabe cosplayed as Cure Miracle in AKB48 Group Unit Single Sōdatsu Janken Taikai in Kobe World Kinen Hall on October 10, 2016. She later made a guest appearance in the 38th episode of the original series. A dance to the Mayu Watanabe song was broadcast in the endings of the 38th and 39th episode of the original series.

The Miracle Light for this movie, was distributed to children, while a sticker set, was given to 300,000 people nationwide.

Reception 
31,740 tickets were sold in the first two days of the release date, four times more than the previous film, alongside 139,830 people on 213 screens nationwide, recording a box-office revenue of ¥16,226,200; it was ranked fourth place by Kōgyō Tsūshin. The year-by-year increase hit a record 126% with the movie. Pia ranked the film at 3rd place with a satisfaction level of 92.0. On November 1, the cumulative audience attendance of the Pretty Cure franchise reached 15 million. The final revenue was 670 million yen, a recovery trend compared to the previous year.

Music

Single 

 is an insert song of the anime film Witchy Pretty Cure! The Movie: Wonderous! Cure Mofurun!. The single was released from Marvelous on October 12, 2016. The single topped at #66 in the Oricon Singles Chart on October 24, 2016. The symphonic and serious up-tempo is coupled with a ballad, .

Track listing 
  [4:41]
 Sung by:  Cure Miracle (Rie Takahashi), Cure Magical (Yui Horie), Cure Felice (Saori Hayami), and Mofurun (Ayaka Saitou)
 Lyrics: Kumiko Aoki
 Work and Arrangement: Hiroshi Takagi
 Insert song of Witchy Pretty Cure! The Movie: Wonderous! Cure Mofurun!
  [4:48]
 Sung by: Miral Asahina (Takahashi) and Mofurun (Saitou)
 Lyrics and Work: Noriko Fujimoto
 Arrangement: Masayuki Fukutomi
 Later used as a song in episode 49 of the main series.
  [4:41]
  [4:43]

Soundtrack 

The film's original soundtrack was released on October 26, 2016. Hiroshi Takaki recorded the soundtrack. It topped at #271 in the Oricon Albums Chart on November 7.

Home media 
The film's DVD/BD was released on March 1, 2017. On March 13 the special-version DVD and regular-version DVD charted at 12 and 30 in the Oricon DVD Chart, while the BR charted at 10 in the Blu-ray Disc Chart.

References

External links 
  
 

Japanese magical girl films
Pretty Cure films
Toei Animation films
2010s Japanese films
2016 anime films
2016 computer-animated films
Films about witchcraft
Films about festivals
Films about wish fulfillment